Methyl dihydrojasmonate is an aroma compound that smells similar to jasmine. In racemic mixtures the odor is floral and citrus while epimerized mixtures exhibit a dense buttery-floral odor with odor recognition thresholds of 15 parts per billion.

The compound is also known as hedione or kharismal. Its boiling point is 110°C at 0.2 mmHg and it has an refractive Index: 1.45800 to 1.46200  (20.00°C).

See also
 Methyl jasmonate

References

perfume ingredients
Methyl esters
Cyclopentanes
Plant hormones